Lester Corrin Strong (1892–1966) was an American diplomat. From 1953 to 1957 he was the United States ambassador to Norway.

Biography 
Strong was politically appointed ambassador and was nominated for the embassy mission by President Dwight D. Eisenhower. He presented his credentials on August 10, 1953, to King Haakon VII of Norway, and served until February 16, 1957.

Strong had great interest in visual art. In 1953, the Museum of Modern Art (MoMA) in New York City formed The International Council of The Museum of Modern Art to facilitate exhibitions of American art around the world. In cooperation with MoMA, Strong and his wife hosted a trial exhibition of American art in his residence Villa Otium in Oslo. Several works from MoMA were lent to the residence including Alfonso Roybal’s Green Corn Ceremony, John Kane’s Homestead, Walter Kuhn’s Apples in the Hay, and Stuart Davis’ Summer Landscape.

The trial formed the basis for the Art in the Embassies Program, which still exists today. Strong left his post on February 16, 1957.

After his tenure in Oslo, Strong served as president of the National Cultural Center, a forerunner to the John F. Kennedy Center for the Performing Arts.

Strong died in 1966.

References 

1892 births
1966 deaths
Ambassadors of the United States to Norway